is a former Japanese football player. He played for Japan national team.

Club career
Hirase was born in Kagoshima Prefecture on 23 May 1977. After graduating from high school, he joined Kashima Antlers in 1996. He played many matches from 1999. In 2000, the club won all three major title in Japan; J1 League, J.League Cup and Emperor's Cup. In 2001, the club won the champions J1 League for 2 years in a row. In July 2002, he moved to Yokohama F. Marinos on loan. He returned to Kashima Antlers in 2003 and moved to Vissel Kobe in August 2004. He moved to Vegalta Sendai in 2008. He retired end of 2010 season.

National team career
On 5 February 2000, Hirase debuted for Japan national team against Mexico. He played 2 games for Japan in 2000.

In September 2000, Hirase was selected Japan U-23 national team for 2000 Summer Olympics. He played 2 matches.

Club statistics

National team statistics

Appearances in major competitions

References

External links

 
 Japan National Football Team Database
 
 

1977 births
Living people
Association football people from Kagoshima Prefecture
Japanese footballers
Japan international footballers
J1 League players
J2 League players
Kashima Antlers players
Yokohama F. Marinos players
Vissel Kobe players
Vegalta Sendai players
Olympic footballers of Japan
Footballers at the 2000 Summer Olympics
Association football forwards